Abdiqani Mohamoud Jidhe is a Somali politician, who is currently serving as the Governor of Gebiley region of Somaliland since November 2021. He was also the former Governor of Sool region of Somaliland assumed office in January 2019 until November 2021. Where he was assumed as the Governor of Gebiley region of Somaliland.where he is currently serving since 2021.

See also

 Governor of Sool
 Sool Region

References

Living people
Somaliland politicians
Year of birth missing (living people)